Two Songs is a set of two songs for voice and piano composed in 1920 by John Ireland (18791962).

A performance of both songs takes about 5 minutes. The songs are:

 "The Trellis" (words by Aldous Huxley (18941963) 
 "My True Love Hath My Heart" (words by Sir Philip Sidney (155486), from Arcadia)

References 

Song cycles by John Ireland
1920 compositions
Aldous Huxley
Musical settings of poems by Sir Philip Sidney
Songs based on poems